The Forced Marriage (Civil Protection) Act 2007 (c 20) is an Act of the Parliament of the United Kingdom. It seeks to assist victims of forced marriage, or those threatened with forced marriage, by providing civil remedies. It extends to England and Wales and Northern Ireland – it does not extend to Scotland, as this is a devolved competence.

Forced marriage protection order 
The centrepiece of the Act is the forced marriage protection order (FMPO). A person threatened with forced marriage can apply to court for a forced marriage order can contain whatever provisions which the court finds would be appropriate to prevent the forced marriage from taking place, or to protect a victim of forced marriage from its effects, and may include such measures as confiscation of passport or restrictions on contact with the victim. The subject of a forced marriage order can be not just the person to whom the forced marriage will occur, but also any other person who aids, abets or encourages the forced marriage. A marriage can be considered forced not merely on the grounds of threats of physical violence to the victim, but also through threats of physical violence to third parties (e.g. the victim's family), or even self-violence (e.g. marriage procured through threat of suicide.) A person who violates a force marriage order is subject to contempt of court proceedings and may be arrested.

History
It was introduced as a private member's bill into the House of Lords by Lord Lester of Herne Hill on the 16 November 2006. It was passed by the House of Lords on 13 June 2007, passed by the House of Commons on the 17 July 2007, and received royal assent on 26 July 2007. Unusually, although this was a private member's bill, almost the entire contents of the bill was replaced by Government amendments in the Grand Committee, with the support of Lord Lester.

The Act modified practices heretofore governed by the Family Law Act 1996; punishment of FMPO offences is further detailed in Part 10 of the Anti-social Behaviour, Crime and Policing Act 2014.

Prior to this the Children Act 1989 section 8 could be used by local authorities to issue a prohibited steps order to prevent parents from taking a child to get forcibly married.

References

External links
The Forced Marriage (Civil Protection) Act 2007, as amended from the National Archives
The Forced Marriage (Civil Protection) Act 2007, as originally enacted from the National Archives
Explanatory notes to the Forced Marriage (Civil Protection) Act 2007
The Forced Marriage (Civil Protection) Act 2007 (Commencement No.1) Order 2008 (S.I. 2008/2779 (C.122))
The Forced Marriage (Civil Protection) Act 2007 (Commencement No. 1) Order (Northern Ireland) 2008 (S.I. 2008/446 (C.26))
Forced Marriage Unit
House of Commons Library, Research Paper 07/56, Forced Marriage (Civil Protection) Bill (HL), Bill 129 of 2006-07, 28 June 2007
Explanatory Notes to the Bill, prepared by the Ministry of Justice
UK Parliament website, summary of bill progress and links to debates

United Kingdom Acts of Parliament 2007
Marriage law in the United Kingdom
Forced marriage